The West Iron County High School is one of two high schools in Iron County, Michigan. It is part of the West Iron County School District. Their mascot is the Wykon. This school was a consolidation of "Iron River High School" and "Stambaugh High School".

Notable alumni
Nick Baumgartner: 2010 and 2014 US Olympic Snowboard Cross Team Member 
Jan Quarless: Division 1 head football coach

External links
 School Site

References

Public high schools in Michigan
Schools in Iron County, Michigan
1968 establishments in Michigan